The Jishixia Dam is a concrete face rock-fill embankment dam on the Yellow River in Qinghai Province, China. The purpose of the dam is hydroelectric power generation and flood control. The dam supports a power station with 3 x 340 MW Francis turbines for a total installed capacity of 1,020 MW. Construction on the dam began in 2005 and the river was diverted in March 2007. The first generator was operational in mid-2010 and the rest by the end of the year.

See also 

 List of power stations in China

References

Hydroelectric power stations in Qinghai
Dams in China
Dams on the Yellow River
Concrete-face rock-fill dams
Dams completed in 2005